Ideas and Discoveries or i.D. is a magazine covering science, with a heavy interest in social science. The magazine was first published on 10 December 2010. It is an American magazine available in newsstands, published on a bi-monthly basis. It is part of the Bauer Media Group. This magazine is modeled after the German magazine . It is a relatively new magazine, with limited content exposure from its website.

"iD magazine offers a perfect balance of science, nature, psychology, history and current events, combined with stunning photography and graphics, put together in a uniquely compelling way."

References

External links
 Official website
 Publisher website

Bimonthly magazines published in the United States
Bauer Media Group
Magazines established in 2010
Popular science magazines
Magazines published in New Jersey
2010 establishments in New Jersey
Science and technology magazines published in the United States